Malick Bolivard (born 17 June 1987) is a Martiniquais professional footballer.

References

External links
 

1987 births
Living people
People from La Trinité, Martinique
French footballers
Martiniquais footballers
French people of Martiniquais descent
Association football forwards
Hertha BSC II players
FC Hansa Rostock players
SV Babelsberg 03 players
Expatriate footballers in Germany
2. Bundesliga players
3. Liga players
FC Chartres players